Hala Salamé, known as Léa Salamé (born 27 October 1979), is a Lebanese-born French journalist.

Early life
Hala Salamé is the daughter of Ghassan Salamé, former Lebanese Minister of Culture and former special advisor to UN Secretary-General Kofi Annan; her mother, Mary Boghossian, of Armenian descent, is the sister of diamond dealers Jean and Albert Boghossian. She escaped war in Lebanon with her family, settled in Paris at age 5 and obtained French nationality at age 11.

Léa Salamé studied law at Panthéon-Assas University and Sciences Po. She spent a year at New York University, where she was injured in the September 11 attacks.

Career
Salamé began her career as an intern on La Chaîne parlementaire with Jean-Pierre Elkabbach. In September 2006, she started working for newly created French international news TV channel France 24.

Salamé joined i>Télé in late 2010 and hosted a political show in the context of the 2012 French presidential election. Starting in September 2011, she hosted the evening news with Marc Fauvelle and in September 2012, a political debate programme. The next year, she hosted Ça se dispute with Éric Zemmour and Nicolas Domenach as commentators.

In August 2014, Salamé succeeded Natacha Polony in the duo of commentators which she formed with Aymeric Caron, then with Yann Moix, in Laurent Ruquier's show, On n'est pas couché, aired on France 2. In May 2016, she announced that she would leave to host a political show with David Pujadas starting in September 2016, in the context of the 2017 French presidential election.

Since August 2014, Salamé has hosted the 7:50 a.m. interview in France Inter's morning show. Since December 2015, she has also conducted high-profile interviews in the French edition of GQ.

On 14 April 2016, as she interviewed President François Hollande with David Pujadas in the programme Dialogues citoyens on France 2, Léa Salamé replied to President Hollande, who was making a comment on refugees, "Are you joking?", which triggered many reactions on social media.

With Les Arènes, journalist Léa Salamé published her first book, "Strong Women", a series of 12 intimate interviews around female power, originally conducted as a podcast in the summer of 2019, in which she revealed her pantheon of femininity.
In the summer of 2019, she conducted a series of interviews branded "Powerful Women" at Inter, France - published as a podcast - around the female individuality in relation to power and femininity, exercised in these varied different fields: Publishing, literature, film, business or sports.
Through this book, the journalist reveal her pantheon of women: Leïla Slimani, Chloé Bertolus, Christiane Taubira, Laure Adler, Élisabeth Badinter, Béatrice Dalle, Nathalie Kosciusko-Morizet, Bettina Rheims, Sophie De Closets, Amélie Mauresmo, Anne Méaux and The funny ladies of Delphine Horvilleurthe Léa Salamé. 
Not intended to be a feminist manifesto, Strong Women is a book of interviews with 12 female figures in her personal pantheon. For journalists, inspirational characters, the subject of a beautiful book, their meeting and divergence points, strengths and weaknesses, under the sign of sharing, expressing and affirming: all of which fill one's life. inspiration. Liberation, exploration, and relentless affirmation in a world in power - a feminine word, often monopolised by men.

Awards 
 "Woman of the year 2014" by the French edition of GQ
 "Best interviewer of the year 2015" (Prix Philippe-Caloni)

References 

https://www.amazon.com/Femmes-puissantes-AR-ANTHOL-PRESS-L%C3%A9a-Salam%C3%A9/dp/B083WCSMX8

1979 births
Living people
French people of Armenian descent
French people of Lebanese descent
Lebanese emigrants to France
Naturalized citizens of France
Radio France people
Sciences Po alumni
Paris 2 Panthéon-Assas University alumni
New York University alumni
Lebanese women journalists
Lebanese journalists
French television journalists
People from Beirut
Women television journalists
Survivors of terrorist attacks
French expatriates in the United States